The national flag of Mongolia is a vertical triband with a red stripe at each side and a blue stripe in the middle, with the Mongolian Soyombo symbol centering on the leftmost stripe. The blue stripe represents the eternal blue sky, and the red stripes thriving for eternity. The Soyombo symbol is a geometric abstraction that represents fire, sun, moon, earth, water, and a Taijitu symbol representing the duality of yin and yang.

The current flag was adopted on 12 January 1992, with the current official colour standards being set on 8 July 2011. Until 1992, the flag had a communist star above the Soyombo, during the final 47 years of the Mongolian People's Republic. The flag was originally designed by artist Dodiin Choidog.

It has become common practice among Mongolians in the Inner Mongolia autonomous region to hang the Mongolian flag, although the Chinese government is allegedly against public displays of Mongolian national or cultural symbols due to concerns of separatism.

Historical flags

Other flags of Mongolia

Administrative divisions

Colours

Official colour standards for the flag were approved in July 2011.

Construction Sheet

See also

 List of Mongolian flags
 Emblem of Mongolia
 National anthem of Mongolia
 Soyombo symbol
 Taijitu
 Tug (banner)

References

Flag
National flags
Flags introduced in 1911
Flags introduced in 1992
Flags introduced in 2011